A list of films produced in Turkey in the 2000s:

2000s

References

External links
 Turkish films at the Internet Movie Database

2000s
Turkish
Films